Gál is a Hungarian surname. Notable people with the surname include:

András Gál (born 1989), Hungarian football defender with BFC Siófok
Bernhard Gál (born 1971), Austrian artist, composer and musicologist
Gyula Gál (born 1976), Hungarian handball player
Hans Gál (1890–1987), Austro-British composer, teacher and pianist
Henrik Gál (born 1947), Hungarian former Olympic wrestler
István Sándor Gál or Steven Gaal (born 1924), Hungarian-American mathematician
Kinga Gál (born 1970), a Hungarian politician and political writer
Minya Csaba Gál (born 1985), Romanian rugby union footballer
Róbert Gál (born 1979), Hungarian artistic gymnast
Sándor Gál (1868-1937), Hungarian lawyer and politician
Tímea Gál (born 1984), Hungarian woman footballer
Zoltán Gál (born 1940), Hungarian politician
Zoltán J. Gál (born 1973), Hungarian politician

See also
Gal (disambiguation)
Gaal (disambiguation)

Hungarian-language surnames